Néstor Jesús García Veiga (Arrecifes, March 27, 1945) is an Argentine racing driver. He won the Sport Prototipo Argentino championship in 1970 and Fórmula 1 Mecánica Argentina championship in 1973.

Racing record

Complete Formula One World Championship results
(key)

Non-Championship Formula One results
(key)

24 Hours of Le Mans results

References

1945 births
Living people
People from Arrecifes
Argentine racing drivers
24 Hours of Le Mans drivers
24 Hours of Daytona drivers
Argentine sportsperson-politicians
World Sportscar Championship drivers
World Rally Championship drivers
Argentine rally drivers
Turismo Carretera drivers
Sportspeople from Buenos Aires Province